The United Church in Zambia is the largest Protestant church in Zambia with coverage of all the ten provinces of the country
The church formed on 16 January 1965, this is a result of the union of Church of Central Africa, Rhodesia (a mission work of the Church of Scotland), the Union Church of Copperbelt, the Copperbelt Free Church Council, the Church of Barotseland and the Methodist church.

The United Church in Zambia has partnership relations with the United Church of Canada. The church maintains its own Theological Colleges in Zambia.

The United Church in Zambia has 3,000,000 members in 1,060 congregations. The United church has Presbyterian church government with 10 presbyteries and a Synod. It is a member of the World Communion of Reformed Churches and the World Methodist Council. Close contacts with the Church of Scotland and the Presbyterian Church (USA) were established.

References

External links 
United Church website

Protestant denominations established in the 20th century
Members of the World Communion of Reformed Churches
Churches in Zambia
Presbyterian denominations in Africa
Christian organizations established in 1965
Christian denominations in Africa
1965 establishments in Zambia